Mons Lie (15 February 1757 – 2 August 1827) was a Norwegian police chief and writer.

He was born in Ålen as a son of Jonas Monsen Storli (1715–1791) and Karen Svendsdotter Aspaas (born 1717). His mother was a first cousin of Svend Aspaas. In February 1777 he married Dorothea Wollan, but the marriage did not last. From October 1793 he was married to Elisabeth Sofie Müller (1772–1810). After her death he married Anna Margrethe Hagerup (1768–1840), a daughter of Christian Frederik Hagerup, in March 1811.

Mons Lie was the ancestor of several notable people. His grandson Mons Lie (1803–1881) married a sister of Erik Røring Møinichen and had the daughters Erika (Nissen), Ida and Thomasine Lie. Another grandson Michael Strøm Lie (1807–1852) was the father of well-known writer Jonas Lie, who also married Thomasine Lie.

Lie made his way from the family farm Storli, via Røros where he was an errand boy for Peder Hjort, to the regional center Trondhjem where he was hired as a clerk for auditor-general Andreas Klingenberg. He advanced in the ranks within Klingenberg's business. From 1793 to 1811 he practised as an attorney (prokurator) in Trondhjem city. He was also fire chief from 1800, and member of the city's council (rådmann, must not be confused with the democratic city council introduced by law in 1837) from 1808. From 1817 to his death he was the chief of police in the city. He died in August 1827 in Trondhjem.

He was also a songwriter. Research points out that his songs were widespread in the 19th century, but only one song has been preserved in written form. "Sang for de trondhjemske Soldater" is found in O. Stuevold-Hansen's 1873 book Bygdefortælling. Optegnelser fra Tydalen, Annex til Sælbu as well as in a 1902 issue of Syn og Segn.

References

1757 births
1827 deaths
Norwegian civil servants
Norwegian police chiefs
Norwegian songwriters
People from Holtålen
People from Trondheim